This is a list of mayors of Windsor, Berkshire, England.

William Pury: mayor 1518–19, 1522-3
Thomas Ryther: mayor 1512, 1524–5.

References

Windsor
People from Windsor, Berkshire